Niamina West is one of the ten districts of the Central River Division in the Gambia. In the 2013 census, it had a population of 7,293.

References 

Central River Division
Districts of the Gambia